Antanimandry is a town and commune in Madagascar. It belongs to the district of Antsirabe II, which is a part of Vakinankaratra Region, north-west from Antsirabe. The population of the commune was 12,736 in 2013 census.

It is composed by 8 villages (fokontany): Antanimandry, Ambohidrano, Masiniloharano, Andrianana, Ampahadiminy, Avaradrano, Antsongobe and Masinandraina.

Primary and junior level secondary education are available in town. The majority 99% of the population of the commune are farmers, while an additional 1% receives their livelihood from raising livestock. The most important crop is rice, while other important products are beans, maize and potatoes.

References

Populated places in Vakinankaratra